Agostino Veneziano ("Venetian Agostino"), whose real name was Agostino de' Musi (c. 1490 – c. 1540), was an important and prolific Italian engraver of the Renaissance.

Life
Veneziano was born in Venice, where he trained as an artist, though his teacher is unknown.  He initially copied prints by Albrecht Dürer and Giulio Campagnola from about 1512-14, and then producing his own works, somewhat in the style of the latter.  He spent some time in Florence around 1515-16.  He moved to Rome, perhaps as early as 1514,  and by 1516 had joined the printmaking workshop of Marcantonio Raimondi, of which he was one of the most important members until it was broken up by the Sack of Rome in 1527.  Unlike many produced by the workshop, most of Agostino's plates avoided being confiscated and melted down by Charles V's soldiers, and continued to be printed in later years. Agostino returned to Venice after the sack, and later visited Mantua and Florence before returning to Rome in 1531, remaining until at least 1536. It is assumed he died there, though there is no documentation. 
He was the only major figure whose career spanned the whole period which saw the birth of the reproductive print, and the beginnings of the "industrialization" of Italian printmaking.

Works
Although many of his prints bear his monogram, others do not, and he is a party in several disputed attributions, among them perhaps his most famous print, Lo stregozzo (The Sorcerers), an extravagant fantasy rather atypical of his work.  Some works are disputed between him and Campagnola, and later between him and Raimondi or others in his circle; his manner was never very individual, but his technique good enough to allow confusion between his work and those whose style he followed.  The Academy of Baccio Bandinelli of 1531 is also an important work, but his many prints after Raphael and Giulio Romano were the best known of his works in his own day.  His print known as The Climbers (1521) records a part of a cartoon drawing by Michelangelo for a large painting of the Battle of Cascina for the Palazzo Vecchio in Florence, never completed. He made a large series of prints of the story of Psyche to designs by Michael Coxcie. His career probably never entirely recovered from the Sack of Rome; in Venice his illustrations for Serlio were not used, though he continued to produce prints after Raphael, Giulio Romano and others in his later years, sometimes doing new versions of his older works.  In his  final Roman period he produced a series of prints of antique vases, that were early examples of the images of antiquities that were to become so common. 

Passavant attributed 188 prints to him, though a new total would probably increase this number; 141 prints have his monogram, and probably all are by him.

Notes

References
Christopher Witcombe in Grove Art Online. Oxford University Press, accessed Nov 11, 2007
Landau, David, in: David Landau & Peter Parshall, The Renaissance Print, Yale, 1996, 
Agostino Veneziano engravings from de Verda Collection2345

Italian engravers
1490 births
1540 deaths